The Noosgulch River is a river in the Bella Coola Valley of the Central Coast region of British Columbia, Canada, flowing southwest from the southernmost Kitimat Ranges to meet the Bella Coola River just north of Nusatsum Mountain.

See also
List of British Columbia rivers

References

Bella Coola Valley
Rivers of the Kitimat Ranges
Rivers of the Central Coast of British Columbia
Range 3 Coast Land District